Paulo Roberto Bauer (born March 20, 1957) is a Brazilian politician. He has represented Santa Catarina in the Federal Senate since 2011. Previously he was a Deputy from Santa Catarina from 1991 to 1999 and from 2003 to 2007. He was Vice-Governor of Santa Catarina from 1999 to 2003. He is a member of the Brazilian Social Democracy Party.

References

Living people
1957 births
Members of the Federal Senate (Brazil)
Brazilian Social Democracy Party politicians
People from Blumenau
20th-century Brazilian lawyers